Political journalism is a broad branch of journalism that includes coverage of all aspects of politics and political science, although the term usually refers specifically to coverage of civil governments and political power.

Political journalism aims to provide voters with the information to formulate their own opinion and participate in community, local or national matters that will affect them. According to Edward Morrissey in an opinion article from theweek.com, political journalism frequently includes opinion journalism, as current political events can be biased in their reporting. The information provided includes facts, its perspective is subjective and leans towards one viewpoint.

Brendan Nyhan and John M. Sides argue that "Journalists who report on politics are frequently unfamiliar with political science research or question its relevance to their work". Journalists covering politics who are unfamiliar with information that would provide context to their stories can enable the story to take a different spin on what is being reported.

Political journalism is provided through different mediums, in print, broadcast, or online reporting. Digital media use has increased and it provides instant coverage of campaigns, politics, event news, and an accessible platform for the candidate. Media outlets known for their political journalism like The New York Times and the Washington Post, have increased their use of this medium as well. Printed, online, and broadcast political humor presented as entertainment has been used to provide updates on aspects of government status, political news, campaign, and election updates. According to Geoffrey Baym, the information provided may not be considered "fake news" but the lines between entertainment and factual news may seem blurred or biased while providing political updates. This type of journalism is analyzed, interpreted, and discussed by news media pundits and editorialists. It can lack objectivity which can prevent the accuracy of the presented information. The reporting of news with a bias viewpoint can also take away the audience's ability to form their own opinion or beliefs of what has been reported. This type of reporting is subjective with a possible social or political purpose.

Overview 
Civic journalism has begun to develop a strong following again after first emerging as a philosophy in the late 1980s and early 1990s. Those who find civic journalism to be a new, progressive, and profound method for the media to engage with the public see it as an opportunity to revitalize democracy as we know it. As technological advances overtake the modern world, it is becoming less common for the general public to buy newspapers or watch TV news to inform themselves on the events in the political sphere. Including this, younger generations, such as, Generation Y (Millennials) and Generation Z, are not coming out to the polls due to a variety of reasons. Overall, democracy is beginning to fail as there is a lack of civic engagement and even interference with democratic processes, such as Russia's involvement with the 2016 United States election, and even electronic voting (e-voting) machines that are being hacked and altering results. All in all, proponents of civic journalism believe that for democracy to regain its traction and glory in the modern world, the media must be more receptive to feedback from the public and take initiative to engage the public as well.

According to Oxford Research Encyclopedias, the popularity of political journalism is rising, and the area is becoming one of the more dominant domains of journalism. Political journalism is meant to be more of an overseer of the democratic process as they relate to civic engagement rather than a scapegoat for the issues with democracy. Including this, there are four key concepts that political journalism can be boiled down to. These concepts are the framing of politics as a strategic game, interpretive versus straight news, conflict framing and media negativity, and finally, political or partisan bias. In essence, these can be viewed as the four quintessential pillars of civic journalism.

Goals 
The goal of civic journalism, or public journalism, is to allow the community to remain engaged with journalists and news outlets, restore democratic values, and rebuild the public's trust in journalists. The concept of fake news arose due to the fact that it is so easy to manipulate or twist information these days and create a certain narrative that might be entirely incorrect. This has led to an overall decrease in the credibility that people have for journalists and media sources. Certain media sources or news outlets often come under a lot of heat for certain stories or narratives they push which are built upon fallacies. People argue for participatory democracy, but politics now is largely considered a popularity contest and consists of politicians making decisions to ensure their reelection. Proponents of civic journalism believe that this philosophy will allow individuals to have a greater say in decision-making and in the broader political sphere.

Given the rise in yellow journalism and search optimization algorithms that create an echo chamber among mass media, civic journalism is entering a niche role where it can shift the position of news within public reception. As of recent, most news publishers undergo more and more observation as their ethics and content come under extensive scrutiny for political biases. In a time where traditional news outlets concern themselves with how to effectively monetize and are not the main distributors of information, civic journalism pivots the role of publishers from distributing information to curating information. Given one of civic journalism's central tenets - making the press a forum for discussion of community issues - a publisher is able to seek out a niche in bolstering local engagement over spreading knowledge of worldly issues readily available via a web search.

Supporters and opponents 
According to the University of Nebraska-Lincoln College of Journalism and Mass Communications, civic journalism is a polarizing philosophy and has a collection of opponents as well. Such opponents of civic journalism find it to be risky and ineffective. They also find the practice to bring about conflicts of interest and believe that it necessitates involvement in public affairs deemed to be unethical. John Bender, assistant professor of new editorial at the University of Nebraska-Lincoln, claimed that journalists who are the most esteemed and high regarded play active roles in helping their community thrive. That practice would be an example of how civic journalism is indeed beneficial for the future of democracy as proponents believe.

Proponents of civic journalism are steadfast on certain issues. They believe that integrating journalism into the democratic process helps to inform voters and makes them more aware of what is occurring in the political sphere. Including this, it could make a difference in the democratic process if all voters were equally informed. An important aspect is ensuring that the information received by the public is all accurate and fact-checked. That is an important aspect that sometimes gives journalism, and certain news sources, a bad reputation, as previously mentioned. Accuracy in political news and journalism can enable voters to be more involved in the democratic process. Civic journalism itself is the process of integrating journalism into the democratic process and allowing voters and the media to play a more active role rather than being witnesses and bystanders in what happens in the political sphere. Moreover, technology also plays an active role in educating voters and determining viewpoints.

Subsets
 Election journalism or electoral journalism is a subgenre of political journalism which focuses upon and analyzes developments related to an approximate election and political campaigns. This type of journalism provides information to the electorate that can educate and help form opinion that empowers a specific vote. This subgenre, like data journalism, makes use of numerical data, such as statistics, polls and historic data in regards to a candidate's chance of success for office, or a party's change in size in a legislature. It provides knowledge that may make the presented news hold more relevance. Information added to the reports are of campaign statuses and political events. A politician's strategy can be exaggerated or provided without context or historical perspective. Trends on each party candidate are reported and at times compared to previous party candidates. The news on the status of the elections, like other political reporting's, are provided in different mediums. The election report coverage has taken full advantage of the digital era in providing instant access to news.
 Defense journalism or military journalism is a subgenre that focuses upon the current status of a nation's military, intelligence and other defense-related faculties. Interest in defense journalism tends to increase during times of violent conflict, with military leaders being the primary actors. During the course of military journalism, news reporters are sometimes assigned to military units to report news taking place in areas of conflict. The term embedded journalism was used when the media was involved in the reporting of the war in Iraq. Embedded journalism can also be biased because it is one-sided. Information reported has been collected from the area the journalist has been stationed with the possibility to lean towards the agenda of the group they have been assigned to. This subgenre of political journalism is also applied to media coming from journalists embedded in a particular campaign or candidate. Like military assignments, reports can be influenced by the message the campaign or candidate is trying to bring across.

See also

Afghanistanism
BBC
Common Sense (pamphlet)
Daniel Defoe
Democracy in America
Embedded journalism
The Federalist Papers
Mediatization (media)
Military journalism in the USA
News conference
Pamphleteer
Parliamentary sketch writing
Political blog
Political scandal
Press gaggle
Press pool
The Staple of News
Jonathan Swift

References

External links
 Chart – Real and Fake News (2016)/Vanessa Otero (basis) (Mark Frauenfelder)
 Chart – Real and Fake News (2014) (2016)/Pew Research Center

Journalism by field
Media analysis
News
Political concepts
Politics